Ramakrishna Hegde ministry was the Council of Ministers in Karnataka, a state in South India headed by Ramakrishna Hegde of the Janata Party.

The ministry had multiple  ministers including the Chief Minister. All ministers belonged to the Janata Party.

After Ramakrishna Hegde, during his previous term, resigned the chief minister post and dissolved the Legislative Assembly on 29 December 1984, the Janata Party won the elections again and he was elected leader. He took charge as Chief Minister of the State on 8 March 1985. He was in power till he resigned on 13 February 1986.

Later he was sworn in as Chief Minister on 16 February 1986.

Chief Minister & Cabinet Ministers 
12c veeranna koratagere

Minister of State

Leader of the House 
Legislative Assembly - Ramakrishna Hegde (Chief minister)
Legislative Council - Abdul Nazir Sab (Minister of Rural development and Wakf)

See also 

 Karnataka Legislative Assembly

References 

Cabinets established in 1985
1985 establishments in Karnataka
1986 disestablishments in India
Hegde
Hegde
Cabinets disestablished in 1986
1985 in Indian politics